305th Division may refer to:

 305th Air Division, United States Air Force
 305th Infantry Division (Wehrmacht), a World War II formation
 305th Rifle Division (Soviet Union)
 305th Division (Vietnam) - Vietnam War 1960s-1975